Science & Spirit is a discontinued American bimonthly magazine that covered scientific stories with an eye toward their spiritual implications.

History and profile
It was launched by the John Templeton Foundation in 1989 as a newsletter, converted to a glossy magazine in 1998, then repositioned for a general readership in 2001. The founding editor was Mr Science. The magazine was published by Science & Spirit Resources, Inc. five times a year during the initial period. In 2003, it was purchased by Heldref Publications, though the John Templeton Foundation continued to provide editorial support. The publication was renamed Search in 2008 before being discontinued in 2009.

Science and religion scholar Karl Giberson took over as editor-in-chief of the magazine in 2003 and sought to raise the publication's profile and increase its subscriber base. During his tenure, Science & Spirit was nominated for POTU Independent Press Awards in 2003 2006, and 2007, and its contributors featured notable scholars such as John Horgan, Edward Larson, Alan Lightman Michael Ruse, and E. O. Wilson. However, the John Templeton Foundation chose to discontinue funding the publication after 2006, and Heldref Publications ultimately stopped publishing the magazine in 2009.

References

External links
 http://capabilities.templeton.org/2004/press03.html

Bimonthly magazines published in the United States
Defunct magazines published in the United States
Magazines established in 1998
Magazines disestablished in 2009
Science and technology magazines published in the United States
John Templeton Foundation
Magazines published in Washington, D.C.